Heather Pease (born September 29, 1975) is an American former synchronized swimmer and Olympic champion.

Heather was a member of the American team that won a gold medal in team event at the 1996 Summer Olympics in Atlanta. She competed in the same event four years later at the Sydney Olympics, finishing in fifth position.

References

1975 births
Living people
American synchronized swimmers
Synchronized swimmers at the 1996 Summer Olympics
Olympic gold medalists for the United States in synchronized swimming
Olympic medalists in synchronized swimming
Medalists at the 1996 Summer Olympics